The name Zoe Nightshade can refer to either of the following fictional characters:
Zoë Nightshade, from the Percy Jackson & the Olympians series.
Zoe Nightshade, a Bond girl from Agent Under Fire and Nightfire video games.